, the current United States ambassador to Trinidad and Tobago is Candace Bond. The United States Embassy is located in Trinidad and Tobago's capital, Port of Spain, and was established there on August 31, 1962.

List of ambassadors

See also
Trinidad and Tobago – United States relations
Foreign relations of Trinidad and Tobago
Ambassadors of the United States

References

Notes

United States Department of State: Background notes on Trinidad and Tobago

External links
 United States Department of State: Chiefs of Mission for Trinidad and Tobago
United States Department of State: Trinidad and Tobago
United States Embassy in Port of Spain

 01
United States
Trinidad and Tobago
Trinidad and Tobago